Noumbiel is one of the 45 provinces of Burkina Faso, located in its Sud-Ouest Region. The province is the least populated province in the country.

Its capital is Batié.

Departments
Noumbiel is divided into 4 departments:
Batié
Kpuere
Legmoin
Midebdo

See also
Regions of Burkina Faso
Provinces of Burkina Faso
Departments of Burkina Faso

References

 
Provinces of Burkina Faso